Staller is a surname. Notable people with the surname include:

Eric Staller (born 1947), American artist who uses light and architecture
George Staller (1916–1992), American outfielder, scout and coach in Major League Baseball
Ilona Staller (born 1951), Hungarian-born Italian politician, porn-star, and singer

See also 

Staller (title)
Staller Center, the main arts building at the State University of New York at Stony Brook
Staller Sattel (el. 2052 m.) is a high mountain pass in the Alps on the border between the Tyrol in Austria and South Tyrol in Italy

Occupational surnames